Protein FAM76B is a protein that in humans is encoded by the FAM76B gene.

References

Further reading